The 1961–62 Norwegian 1. Divisjon season was the 23rd season of ice hockey in Norway. Eight teams participated in the league, and Valerenga Ishockey won the championship.

Regular season

External links 
 Norwegian Ice Hockey Federation

Nor
GET-ligaen seasons
1961 in Norwegian sport
1962 in Norwegian sport